The 1972 Delaware State Hornets football team represented Delaware State College—now known as Delaware State University—as a member of the Mid-Eastern Athletic Conference (MEAC) in the 1972 NCAA College Division football season. Led by sixth-year head coach Arnold Jeter, the Hornets compiled an overall record of 5–4 and a mark of 2–4 in conference play, trying for fifth in the MEAC.

Schedule

References

Delaware State
Delaware State Hornets football seasons
Delaware State Hornets football